Walking with the Night is the fourth studio album by American neo soul/jazz singer Adriana Evans, released through Expansion Records in 2010. The new release was voted album of the month by Soul Express, and features the critically acclaimed single "Weatherman", "Let You Get Away" and "Suddenly"

In the summer of 2011, Evans toured Europe on her, Adriana Live! Tour, which included two sold-out shows at London's Jazz Café. Evans performed songs from the new album, and her earlier albums.

Track listing
All songs written by Jonathan Scott and Adriana Evans

"Weatherman" and "El Sol" co-produced by Rastine Calhoun lll

Notes
Japan edition includes the bonus track, "Surrender (Cut Creator$ Remix)" produced by Cut Creator$.

Singles
Weatherman
Surrender
Suddenly

References

External links
adrianaevans.com
Soul Jones: Adriana Evans & Dred Scott

2010 albums
Adriana Evans albums
Expansion Records albums
Albums produced by Dred Scott (musician)